The Brilliance V6 is a Mid-size CUV produced by Brilliance Auto under the Zhonghua brand. The Brilliance V6 was unveiled on the 2017 Guangzhou Auto Show in China. The Brilliance V6 is a five-seater CUV, and the seven-seater called the Brilliance V7 was launched later during the 2018 Beijing Auto Show.

References

External links 

 Brilliance V6 Official

V6
Mid-size sport utility vehicles
Front-wheel-drive vehicles
Cars introduced in 2017
Crossover sport utility vehicles
Cars of China